Manotes may refer to:
 Manotes (fly), a genus of flies in the family Stratiomyidae
 Manotes (plant), a genus of plants in the family Connaraceae